SC Odesa is a former Ukrainian football team that appeared in 1992 following the reorganization of the Soviet SKA Odesa. The new city municipal team was located in Odesa, Ukraine and previously at one point was part of the Soviet Army sport system.

Brief history 

The club was founded as a sport society of various disciplines in 1944. It began its legacy in the Soviet sport competitions under the name of ODO (Okruzhnoy Dom Offitserov), which meant Regional Officers' Club in Russian. There were many similar Army clubs in various cities across the whole USSR, with the central one being in Moscow. Since 1957 all of them changed names to SKVO (Sport Club of Military District), the club became SKVO Odesa. In 1960 it became SKA (Sport Club of the Army) for all Army clubs except the Moscow one, which became CSKA (the Central Sport Club of the Army). In 1970s it represented the city of Tiraspol in Moldavian SSR, after Tiraspol's team Dnestr Tiraspol was disbanded in 1971. The Odesa sport club was primarily sponsored by the Odesa Military District.

Football section 

For two seasons (1965 and 1966) the football team participated in the Soviet Top League. After the fall of the Soviet Union, SKA Odesa reformed due to lack of funding. The clubs football section reorganized as a separate club sponsored by the city of Odesa and was renamed simply 'SK Odesa' (without the Army part). The new club took part in the first Ukrainian Premier League season in 1992, after being chosen to participate for being one of the top 9 (of 11) Ukrainian teams from the West Division of the Soviet Second League in 1991. At the end of the first season with the fewest points the team was subjected to relegation. Also by the end of the season it changed its name to SK Odesa, because the Odesa Military District, the main sponsor, was disbanded. The club got rescued financially by the municipal government. It never again returned to the Premier League and in 1997 it was relegated to the Druha Liha. The club won the Druha Liha championship convincingly in 1999, but folded because of a shortage of funds. The players were all bought by FC Chornomorets Odesa and formed the club's second team FC Chornomorets-2 Odesa.

Honors 
Cup of the Ukrainian SSR
Winner (1): 1957
Championship of the Ukrainian SSR
Winner (3): 1957, 1963, 1977
Runner up (1): 1961
 Ukrainian Second League
Winner (1): 1998/99 (Group B)

League and Cup history

Soviet Union

Ukraine

Soviet competitions 
{|class="wikitable"
|-bgcolor="#efefef"
! Season
! Div.
! Pos.
! Pl.
! W
! D
! L
! GS
! GA
! P
!Domestic Cup
!colspan=2|Europe
!Notes
|-
|align=center|1989
|align=center|3rd
|align=center|7
|align=center|52
|align=center|17
|align=center|25
|align=center|10
|align=center|58
|align=center|44
|align=center|59
|align=center|
|align=center|
|align=center|
|align=center|
|-
|align=center|1990
|align=center|3rd
|align=center|6
|align=center|42
|align=center|21
|align=center|7
|align=center|14
|align=center|59
|align=center|32
|align=center|49
|align=center|
|align=center|
|align=center|
|align=center|
|-
|align=center|1991
|align=center|3rd
|align=center|10
|align=center|42
|align=center|18
|align=center|7
|align=center|17
|align=center|46
|align=center|42
|align=center|43
|align=center|
|align=center|
|align=center|
|align=center|
|-
|}

Ukrainian competitions 
{|class="wikitable"
|-bgcolor="#efefef"
! Season
! Div.
! Pos.
! Pl.
! W
! D
! L
! GS
! GA
! P
!Domestic Cup
!colspan=2|Europe
!Notes
|-
|align=center|1992
|align=center|1st "B"
|align=center|10
|align=center|18
|align=center|3
|align=center|1
|align=center|15
|align=center|32
|align=center|36
|align=center|7
|align=center|1/16 finals
|align=center|
|align=center|
|align=center bgcolor=red|Relegated
|-
|align=center|1992–93
|align=center|2nd
|align=center|12
|align=center|42
|align=center|15
|align=center|10
|align=center|17
|align=center|54
|align=center|61
|align=center|40
|align=center|1/32 finals
|align=center|
|align=center|
|align=center|
|-
|align=center|1993–94
|align=center|2nd
|align=center|13
|align=center|38
|align=center|12
|align=center|9
|align=center|17
|align=center|43
|align=center|54
|align=center|33
|align=center|1/32 finals
|align=center|
|align=center|
|align=center|
|-
|align=center|1994–95
|align=center|2nd
|align=center|12
|align=center|42
|align=center|16
|align=center|8
|align=center|18
|align=center|51
|align=center|51
|align=center|56
|align=center|1/16 finals
|align=center|
|align=center|
|align=center|
|-
|align=center|1995–96
|align=center|2nd
|align=center|18
|align=center|42
|align=center|11
|align=center|11
|align=center|20
|align=center|35
|align=center|63
|align=center|44
|align=center|1/32 finals
|align=center|
|align=center|
|align=center|
|-
|align=center|1996–97
|align=center|2nd
|align=center|21
|align=center|46
|align=center|14
|align=center|8
|align=center|24
|align=center|47
|align=center|79
|align=center|50
|align=center|1/64 finals
|align=center|
|align=center|
|align=center bgcolor=red|Relegated
|-
|align=center|1997–98
|align=center|3rd "B"
|align=center bgcolor=tan|3
|align=center|32
|align=center|18
|align=center|7
|align=center|7
|align=center|48
|align=center|29
|align=center|61
|align=center|1/32 finals
|align=center|
|align=center|
|align=center|
|-
|align=center|1998–99
|align=center|3rd "B"
|align=center bgcolor=gold|1
|align=center|26
|align=center|22
|align=center|2
|align=center|2
|align=center|73
|align=center|13
|align=center|68
|align=center|1/8 finals
|align=center|
|align=center|
|align=center bgcolor=green|Promoted
|-
|align=center|1999-00
|align=center colspan=13|Refer to FC Chornomorets-2 Odesa
|}

See also 
 Odesa Military District
 FC Chornomorets-2 Odesa
 CS Tiligul-Tiras Tiraspol

References

External links 
  SCA Odesa – Club history at kopanyi-myach.info
 SKA Odesa on Wildstat

 
Odesa, SC
Association football clubs established in 1944
Association football clubs disestablished in 1999
Football clubs in Odesa
1944 establishments in Ukraine
1999 disestablishments in Ukraine
A Odesa, SC
Armed Forces sports society
Military association football clubs in Ukraine
Football clubs in the Ukrainian Soviet Socialist Republic